Aymen Benabderrahmane (born 30 August 1966) is an Algerian politician who is serving as Prime Minister of Algeria since 30 June 2021. He had served as Minister of Finance from June 2020 until February 2022.

Early life
Benabderrahmane was born in Algiers on 30 August 1966. He graduated from the National School of Administration.

Professional career
From 1991 until 2000, he was Inspector of Finance at the General Inspectorate of Finance. From December 2001 until March 2010, Benabderrahmane served as Deputy Director for Control at the General Inspectorate of Finance. In addition, he worked as General Inspector of Finance in 2004 and as General Inspector Chief of Finance in 2006.

Benabderrahmane served as censor of the Bank of Algeria from March 2010 to June 2020. He was promoted to governor of the Bank of Algeria in November 2019, a position he served until June 2020.

Political career
From 23 June 2020 to February 2022, Benabderrahmane served as Minister of Finance. He was appointed Prime Minister on 30 June 2021 and succeeded Abdelaziz Djerad. On 10 July 2021, Benabderrahmane tested positive for COVID-19. Algerian state TV said that he would quarantine for seven days, but will continue performing his duties virtually.

Other activities
 African Development Bank (AfDB), Ex-Officio Member of the Board of Governors (since 2020)
 World Bank, Ex-Officio Member of the Board of Governors (since 2021)
 Multilateral Investment Guarantee Agency (MIGA), World Bank Group, Ex-Officio Member of the Board of Governors (since 2021)

References

|-

|-

1966 births
Living people
Prime Ministers of Algeria
Finance ministers of Algeria
Governors of the Bank of Algeria
People from Algiers
Algerian economists
20th-century economists
21st-century economists
COVID-19 pandemic in Algeria
21st-century Algerian people